Mighty Like a Moose is a 1926 American silent comedy short film written by Charley Chase that was directed by Leo McCarey. It was released by Pathé Exchange on July 18, 1926.

This two-reel short comedy is considered by some scholars to be Chase's finest silent film and is routinely listed among the greatest of all silent comedy short subjects. In 2007, Mighty Like A Moose was selected for preservation in the United States National Film Registry by the Library of Congress, which recognizes American films deemed "culturally, historically, or aesthetically significant."

Plot
In this short silent comedy, a homely husband and his equally unsightly wife improve their looks with plastic surgery without telling each other. The two later meet, and not recognizing each other, begin to flirt, both thinking they are cheating on their spouse.  The film is representative of Chase's adroit blend of farce, surrealism, and sight gags.

Cast
Charley Chase as Mr. Moose
Vivien Oakland as Mrs. Moose
Gale Henry as Wallflower at Party
Charles Clary as Dentist
Ann Howe as The Mooses' Maid
Malcolm Denny as Gigolo at Party

References

External links 

Mighty Like a Moose essay by Daniel Eagan in America's Film Legacy: The Authoritative Guide to the Landmark Movies in the National Film Registry, A&C Black, 2010 , pages 117-119 

 

1926 films
American black-and-white films
Films directed by Leo McCarey
American silent short films
United States National Film Registry films
1926 short films
Silent American comedy films
Films with screenplays by H. M. Walker
Hal Roach Studios short films
American comedy short films
1926 comedy films
Works about plastic surgery
1920s American films